The linea alba is a fibrous structure that runs down the midline of the abdomen in humans and other vertebrates.

Structure 
In humans, the linea alba runs from the xiphoid process to the pubic symphysis down the midline of the abdomen. The name means white line as it is composed mostly of collagen connective tissue, which has a white appearance.

It is formed by the fusion of the aponeuroses of the muscles of the anterior abdominal wall. It separates the left and right rectus abdominis muscles. In muscular individuals, its presence can be seen on the skin, forming the depression between the left and right halves of a "six pack".

Function 
The Linea alba stabilizes the anterior abdominal wall, as it balances contractile forces from the muscles attached to it.

Clinical significance 
A median incision through the linea alba is a common surgical approach for abdominal surgery. This is because it consists of mostly connective tissue, and does not contain any primary nerves or blood vessels.

Additional images

See also
 Linea alba (cheek)
 Linea nigra

References

External links
 
  (before removing skin)
  (after removing skin)
 

Abdomen